Canyon Crest Academy (CCA) is a public high school in San Diego, Southern California. Founded in 2004, the school is a member of the San Dieguito Union High School District and is located in Pacific Highlands Ranch (often considered part of Carmel Valley), a residential suburb neighborhod of San Diego.

History
During the first school year (2004–05) at CCA, only first-year students were admitted into the student body, with a new class being added with each subsequent year. As a result, a complete student body did not exist on campus until the fourth year of instruction (2007–08), when the first class were in their final year. During the first school year, the students were instructed in portable trailers located in the school's parking lot. All facilities were open and construction of the original buildings was completed by the end of the second school year (2005–06). The overall cost of building the campus amounted to $103 million. Until 2014, a lottery was held to determine admission to the school, as the number of students who wished to attend exceeded the school's maximum enrollment. However, as of 2014, the lottery is no longer held and all students in the district who wish to attend can do so. A new building, the B building, was added in early 2016, and was opened by August 2017, to alleviate the capacity issues.

The first group of students chose the raven as the school's mascot.

Curriculum 
CCA follows a semester class schedule instead of a traditional year-based schedule, which means that students can complete eight classes in a year (four in the fall term and four in the spring term), rather than six year-long courses. The current student to teacher ratio is roughly 34:1.

Athletics 
CCA is a member of the Avocado West league in San Diego, along with Torrey Pines High School, La Costa Canyon High School, Carlsbad High School, San Dieguito Academy, and Sage Creek High School. The mascot of Canyon Crest Academy is the raven. Canyon Crest Academy Stadium is a multi-purpose stadium located on the school's campus. 

Fall sports include Boys Water Polo, Girls Golf, Girls Tennis, Girls Volleyball, Cross Country, and Girls Field Hockey; winter sports include Boys Basketball, Boys Soccer, Girls Basketball, Girls Soccer, Girls Water Polo, and Wrestling. Spring sports include Badminton, Boys Golf, Boys Lacrosse, Boys Tennis, Boys Volleyball, Girls Lacrosse, Baseball, Softball, Swim & Dive, Track & Field, and Beach Volleyball CCA does not have a football team or cheerleading squad; the founders of the school did not believe that the culture associated with high school football and cheerleading would be healthy for the students.

Awards and Honors
The Envision Music Program has been selected as one of 130 finalists nationwide for the 2008 and 2011 Grammy Signature Schools National Award for Excellence in School Music Programs.

The school's vocal and theater arts performed The Drowsy Chaperone which was nominated for the Ben Vereen Awards in 2016, with the pit orchestra winning an award, along with awards being given for many individual actors and other school shows.

Canyon Crest's average SAT score in 2015 was 1892, with the national average being 1490; the average ACT score was a 28.5 with a national average of 21.0. In 2007, the College Board announced that CCA's class of 2008 led the nation in AP World History scores for schools of its size.  The AP World History teacher was Mark Van Over.  This accolade was published by the College Board in the 2007 AP Report to the Nation.

In 2012, Newsweek ranked CCA as the 97th best high school in the United States, 20th best west of the Mississippi River, and 10th best in California.

In 2013, Newsweek ranked CCA as the 78th best high school in the United States.

In 2014, Newsweek ranked CCA as the 72nd best high school in the United States.

In 2015, U.S. News ranked CCA as the 89th best public high school in the United States.

In 2018, CCA was ranked #1 in California and #132 nationally; however, private schools were also included in the rankings.

In 2019, CCA was ranked the best public high school in California.

In 2021, CCA was again ranked the best public high school in California.

On February 25, 2015; Canyon Crest Academy broke the world record for the biggest group hug in a school library. The record set was 191, beating the previous record of 74.

Student Body
CCA's demographic is dominated by Caucasians and Asians from the surrounding neighborhoods of North San Diego County such as Carmel Valley, Torrey Hills, Rancho Santa Fe, Del Mar, Solana Beach, and Encinitas. Before 2014, if the number of students who desired to attend CCA after middle school exceeded the number of spaces, a lottery was held. However, as of 2014, the lottery is no longer held and all students in the district who wish to attend can do so.

CCA awards GPAs based on a 4.0 scale, with AP or weighted classes on a 5.0 scale.

Notable alumni
Riley Adams, baseball player
Ryn Weaver, singer
Lili Simmons, actress (did not complete)
Dylan Mulvaney, actress and transgender rights activist

See also
 Primary and secondary schools in San Diego, California

References

External links 
 CCA website
 CCA Foundation website
 CCA Associated Student Body (ASB) website
 CCA Athletics website
 San Dieguito Union High School District

Educational institutions established in 2004
San Dieguito Union High School District
High schools in San Diego
Public high schools in California
2004 establishments in California